Villa-Maria is a Montreal Metro station in the borough of Côte-des-Neiges–Notre-Dame-de-Grâce in Montreal, Quebec, Canada. It is operated by the Société de transport de Montréal (STM) and serves the Orange Line. It is located in the Westmount Adjacent area of the Notre-Dame-de-Grâce neighbourhood, beside the Décarie Expressway trench.

Overview 
The station is a normal side platform station, and has an entrance at its south end. The entrance is located in a bus loop located on the Décarie Autoroute.

Station improvements
In 2019, work began to make the station fully accessible at a cost of $24.6m. The work included the installation of three elevators, station renovation works and the installation of new artwork. The project was completed in November 2022, making Villa-Maria the 23rd accessible station in the Metro.

Architecture and artwork
The station was designed by André Léonard. The architect also designed mural sculptures for the station - comprising large moulded dials in a variety of colours. Floor and wall tiling also make use of these colours throughout the station.

As part of work to make the station accessible, La correspondance des strates by artist Marianne Chevalier was unveiled in September 2022. Using colorful geometric & organic shapes cut of aluminium, the work contrasts with the 1980s sculptures designed by station architect André Léonard.

Origin of name
Villa-Maria station takes its name from the nearby Villa Maria school, which in turn takes its name from the Latin House of Mary.

The surrounding lands were once owned by the Decarie family. The land was sold in 1795 to Sir James Monk and the Monk residence built in 1804 in the central section of the present-day school. In 1844, the building was leased to the Crown as a residence for the Governors-Generals of Canada. (Lord Metcalfe, Earl Cathcart, and Lord Elgin all resided on the Monklands.

The property became a country hotel for five years and was thenpurchased by the nuns of Congregation of Notre Dame in 1854. They turned it into a private girls' school, which they named Villa Maria. The metro station was built at the foot of the Villa Maria property.

Connecting bus routes

Nearby points of interest
Marianopolis College
Villa Maria Girls School
Marymount Academy
The Monkland Village
MAB-Mackay Rehabilitation Centre
Centennial Academy

References

External links
 Villa-Maria Station, official web page
 Villa-Maria metro station geo location
 Montreal by Metro, metrodemontreal.com
 2011 STM System Map
 Metro Map

Accessible Montreal Metro stations
Orange Line (Montreal Metro)
Railway stations in Canada opened in 1981
Côte-des-Neiges–Notre-Dame-de-Grâce